Joseph P. Evans (1835–1888) was an American politician who served as a Republican member of the Virginia House of Delegates from 1871 to 1874 and in the Senate of Virginia from 1874 to 1875, representing Petersburg. He was one of the first African-Americans to serve in Virginia's government.

He ran as an Independent for Virginia's 4th congressional district in 1884, losing to Republican James Dennis Brady and Democrat George E. Rives.

See also
African-American officeholders during and following the Reconstruction era

References

External links

1835 births
1889 deaths
African-American politicians during the Reconstruction Era
African-American state legislators in Virginia
Republican Party members of the Virginia House of Delegates
Republican Party Virginia state senators
19th-century American politicians
Politicians from Petersburg, Virginia